The men's shot put event at the 2007 World Championships in Athletics took place on August 25, 2007 at the Nagai Stadium in Osaka, Japan.

In 2013 it was revealed that Andrei Mikhnevich, the original bronze medalist, tested positive for a prohibited substance at the 2005 World Championships. Since this was his second offense, he was given a lifetime ban and all his results from August 2005 on were annulled.

Medallists

Abbreviations
All results shown are in metres

Records

Results

Qualification

Group A

Group B

Final

References
Official results, qualification - IAAF.org
Official results, final - IAAF.org
Event report - IAAF.org

Shot put
Shot put at the World Athletics Championships